TCDD MT5200 was a series of diesel multiple units operated by the Turkish State Railways. On October 25, 1940, an order for six two-car diesel multiple units was placed with MAN SE (MAN). Because of World War II, only the first two units were delivered, the remaining being delivered to other countries. Three units went to the state railways of the (First) Slovak Republic, ('Slovak Railways'), and one unit stayed in Germany with the Deutsche Bundesbahn. In 1954 MAN delivered an additional two centre cars, to allow conversion to three-car units.

External links
 Trains on Turkey page on MT5200

Diesel multiple units of Turkey